Vitória Sport Clube is a volleyball team based in Guimarães, Portugal. that plays in Portuguese Volleyball League A1.

Achievements
 Portuguese Volleyball League A1: 1
2007/08

 Portuguese Volleyball Cup: 1
2008/09

 Portuguese Volleyball League A2: 1
2000/01

Current Squad 2021-22 Men's

Current Squad 2021-22 Women's

Portuguese volleyball teams

Vitória S.C.